Darius Dumitru Olaru (born 3 March 1998) is a Romanian professional footballer who plays as a midfielder for Liga I club FCSB, which he captains, and the Romania national team.

After starting out at hometown side Gaz Metan Mediaș and amassing over 100 appearances in the Romanian top flight, Olaru transferred to FCSB in 2020. 

Internationally, he represented Romania under-21 in two editions of the UEFA European Championship, in 2019 and 2021. Olaru went on to register his full debut for the country in June 2021, in a 1–2 loss to Georgia.

Club career

Gaz Metan Mediaș
Olaru made his senior debut for Gaz Metan Mediaș on 29 August 2015, appearing in a 2–1 away win over UTA Arad in the second division. He amassed twelve games and scored two goals during the campaign, as his hometown club returned to the Liga I after only one year of absence.

Olaru recorded his debut in the latter competition on 19 September 2016, in a 2–0 victory against defending champions Astra Giurgiu. On 23 May 2017, he scored his first league goal from the penalty spot in a 3–0 defeat of Concordia Chiajna.

FCSB
In early 2018, Olaru signed a precontract with fellow Liga I side FCSB, but the move initially fell through after a transfer fee could not be agreed upon. In May the following year, the capital-based reinstated its interest and signed him for an undisclosed sum, with the deal seeing him join up with the squad at the start of 2020. FCSB reportedly outbid CFR Cluj for the transfer of Olaru, where he was highly regarded by manager Dan Petrescu.

Olaru was officially unveiled as a FCSB player on 7 January 2020, and was assigned the number 27 jersey. He made his first appearance for the Roș-albaștrii in a 0–1 loss to CFR Cluj on 2 February, and four days later scored the opener in a 2–1 win over Voluntari.

Following the conclusion of his first full season at the club, during which he played 30 matches and netted seven times in the league, Olaru was named to the 2020–21 Liga I Team of the Season by the Liga Profesionistă de Fotbal.

International career
Olaru received his first call-up for the Romania national under-21 team in September 2018, and on 15 November that year scored in a 3–3 friendly draw with Belgium in Cluj-Napoca. He was subsequently selected by Mirel Rădoi in Romania's squad for the 2019 UEFA European Under-21 Championship, where he played two matches in the group stage and was an unused substitute as his nation exited the competition after a 2–4 defeat to Germany in the semi-finals. 

Olaru's age also made him eligible for the 2021 edition of the competition, with head coach Adrian Mutu choosing him in the starting eleven in all three group fixtures of the final tournament. Romania finished with the same number of points as the Netherlands and Germany, but could not progress to the knockout stage. Following Olaru's good display throughout the season, Rădoi—who was meanwhile promoted to the senior national team—handed him his full debut on 2 June 2021, in a friendly 1–2 loss to Georgia.

Style of play
After being deployed as an offensive-minded midfielder or a winger in his beginnings, Olaru developed more into a box-to-box midfielder following his transfer to FCSB. Romanian manager Ioan Sabău characterised him as "a player who is physically and mentally involved [in his team], both defends and attacks, also has physical strength and appears earnest".

Personal life
Olaru's parents left Romania in order to work abroad and got divorced at some point during his childhood, leaving him mainly in the care of his grandparents. He stated that he was an ardent supporter of Dinamo București growing up.

Career statistics

Club

International

Honours
Gaz Metan Mediaș
Liga II: 2015–16

FCSB
Cupa României: 2019–20
Supercupa României runner-up: 2020

Individual
Liga I Team of the Season: 2020–21, 2021–22
Gazeta Sporturilor Romania Player of the Month: April 2022

References

External links

1998 births
Living people
People from Mediaș
Romanian footballers
Association football midfielders
Association football wingers
Liga I players
Liga II players
CS Gaz Metan Mediaș players
FC Steaua București players
Romania under-21 international footballers
Romania international footballers